The 2002–03 New Zealand V8 season (the leading motorsport category in New Zealand) consisted of seven rounds beginning on 19–20 October 2002 and ending 29–30 March 2003.

Calendar

Points structure
Points for the 2002/2003 championship are allocated as follows:

Results

References

NZ Touring Cars Championship seasons
V8 season
V8 season